Codruț Sebastian Cioranu (born 10 January 1991, Bucharest) is a Romanian professional footballer who plays as a centre back.

External links
 
 

1991 births
Liga I players
Liga II players
Living people
Romanian footballers
Association football defenders
FC Progresul București players
FC Sportul Studențesc București players
FC Politehnica Iași (2010) players
CS Sportul Snagov players